Chiso Ashtray is a 2022 Nepalese drama film directed by Dinesh Palpali. Starring Shristi Shrestha, Robin Tamang, Divya Dev, Nikun Shrestha, Nabin Lamsal, and Sushil Raj Pandey, the film is based on Bhupi Sherchan's poem "Chiso Ashtray". The film was released on 18 March 2022.

Cast

 Divya Dev as Madan
 Nikun Shrestha as Rony
 Nabin Lamsal as Jacky
 Shristi Shrestha as Salinta
 Sushil Raj Pandey as Bikki Bheja
 Robin Tamang as Boby dai
 Evon Joshi as Albin aaty 
 Rinex Basnet as Bhuwan Bhukka

Synopsis
Madan, an innocent villager, arrives in Kathmandu, the capital city of Nepal with dreams in his eyes, and a heart full of fire. He finds courage in the ruthless city through his mentor, his love, and friends. But, as a Taxi Driver, he is always made to feel inferior to the ultra-modern lifestyle of Kathmandu. The city’s people, culture, and politics always look down on him. In his desperation to fit in, he changes his attire, his lifestyle, and even makes new friends. This change however comes with dire consequences. Now, he is at a risk of losing his friends, his mentor, his love, and even his innocent soul.

Critical reception 
Shranup Tandukar from The Kathmandu Post criticized the character development of the film. He has claimed the problem with the film is that "we do not feel for the lead character at any point in the film". He has praised the cinematography, costumes, and the sound, but has criticized the way the story was told and character was developed.

Music

References 

Nepalese drama films
2020s Nepali-language films
2022 films
2022 drama films